Anthropology from a Pragmatic Point of View is a non-fiction book by German philosopher Immanuel Kant. The work was developed from lecture notes for a number of successful classes taught by Kant from 1772 to 1796 at the Albertus Universität in then Königsberg, Germany. While nominally detailing the nature of anthropology as a field, it additionally discusses a variety of topics in terms of Kantian thought.

Origins and arguments

Background and composition

Kant's work distills the content that he taught in an annual course at the Albertus Universität in then Königsberg, Germany, a program which Kant set forth from 1772 until his retirement in 1796. The book came out in 1798 with the intent of exposing Kant's viewpoints on the then embryonic intellectual field of anthropology to a wider audience. Despite not being free, unlike other speaking engagements by Kant, the philosopher's classes on the topic had achieved widespread popular interest in contrast to previous attempts to spread his general ideas to the masses.

Anthropology from a Pragmatic Point of View wound up being the last major work of Kant that was edited by the philosopher himself. The strain of his age and the state of his health had significantly affected his writing. Despite the meaning that he attached to the book, those factors meant that he found himself unable to do more much than arrange his lecture notes for publication.

Summing up Kant's views on ideals in the context of the book's composition, scholar Frederick P. Van De Pitte has written,

Methodology and views expressed

Within the work, Kant remarks that anthropology seeks to answer the fundamental question "what is the human being" and thus can be considered the academic discipline with the highest intellectual scope. A later reviewer commented about Kant's opinions that "[o]ne of the many lessons... is that at the empirical level of application, there is no sharp dividing line between morality and nature, since empirical psychology can function as empirical ethics for this purpose." In conclusion, according to the reviewer, "[h]uman beings in nature are acting, moral beings".

Exploring in multiple aspects the causes and effects of people's behavior, Kant spends many pages on topics such as the biological as well as psychological capacity for individuals to live through and comprehend experiences. For instance, the writing details Kant's views on the external senses as well as the particular nature of different mental states from drunkenness to sleep. He expands to discussions on social organization and interpersonal relations while inserting numerous comments about different types of people as well as various life events. Many of these relate to observations of humanity itself, generally speaking.

Specifically, Kant states that "a mind of slow apprehension is therefore not necessarily a weak mind" since "the one who is alert with
abstractions is not always profound" but "is more often very superficial." He argues, "[t]he deceiver is really the fool." On determination and mental resolve, in addition, Kant asserts that "[t]hrough failures one becomes intelligent" and "the one who has trained himself in this subject so that he can make others wise through their own failures... [thus] has used his intelligence." Kant defends what he describes as the seeking of knowledge by even the uncertain layperson, the philosopher arguing "[i]gnorance is not stupidity."

The book additionally features detailed accounts by Kant of him applying his "categorical imperative" concept to various issues in real experience. For example, he writes about the contrast between striving idealism and personal vice, the philosopher writing,

On the subject of religion, he laments what he sees as unnecessary conflict in terms of cognitive purposes and the regular practice of devotion, Kant remarking,

Comparing and contrasting different human groups, Kant makes a variety of assertions about men and women as well as different ethnicities, nationalities, and races. For instance, he writes about the sexes, "[t]he woman wants to dominate, [and] the man wants to be dominated". The philosopher argues in depth that nature "made women mature early and had them demand gentle and polite treatment from men, so that they would find themselves imperceptibly fettered by a child due to their own magnanimity" and additionally "would find themselves brought, if not quite to morality itself, then at least to that which cloaks it, moral behavior". In Kant's eyes, ideal marriage exists in such a way that a woman acts like a monarch while a man acts like a cabinet minister.

In terms of differing nations, Kant asserts that important generalities can be made about the peoples of various areas, stating specifically,

In sum, the philosopher views ethical analysis fundamentally as constituting "practical anthropology". He aims not to necessarily assign duties to individuals but to empower them intellectually so that they can properly set their own paths themselves. Dovetailing on the same issues, the concluding section of Anthropology from a Pragmatic Point of View discusses "the character of the species" and evaluates the necessity of giving space for personal freedom as a key element in broader social advancement.

Analysis and scholarly treatment

Scholars Victor L. Dowdell and Hans H. Rudnick have argued that Anthropology from a Pragmatic Point of View constitutes the best way for layperson readers to begin learning Kant's philosophy.

Introduction to Kant's Anthropology (French: Introduction à l'Anthropologie), seminal intellectual figure Michel Foucault's analysis of Kant's book, served as Foucault's secondary thesis (alongside a translation of Kant's work itself plus Foucault's writing Folie et Déraison: Histoire de la folie à l'âge classique) in 1964.

Foucault's work received an English translation and widespread publication in the 2000s. In his analysis, the French scholar evaluates the question of whether or not psychology has supplanted metaphysics in the evolution of reasoning. He specifically warns against this. Foucault additionally writes that Kant's understandings highlighted the fact that empirical knowledge about human nature has been intrinsically tied up with language. Thus, a person can be considered a citizen of the world insofar as he or she speaks.

Reception

Upon its initial release, Anthropology from a Pragmatic Point of View generated a considerable public response. The book ended up receiving the highest number of printings of any of Kant's works up to that time in its initial run. Despite this, multiple writers considered the work unworthy of serious intellectual analysis. For many years, it became seen as a lesser work in the context of Kant's entire bibliography.

Recent analysis of the book have described it as a vital resource on Kant's thinking. For example, a 2007 article published by the journal Notre Dame Philosophical Reviews labeled it as "increasingly important", 
with reviewer Frederick Rauscher, a professor at Michigan State University and writer, noting the work's "complex nature" in detailing interesting topics.

See also

1798 in literature
Age of Enlightenment
Anthropology
Ethics
Immanuel Kant bibliographyThe Critique of Practical ReasonThe Groundwork of the Metaphysics of MoralsThe Metaphysics of MoralsReligion Within the Boundaries of Mere ReasonIntroduction to Kant's Anthropology'', analysis by Michel Foucault
Kantianism
Philosophy of life

References

External links

Anthropology from a Pragmatic Point of View - Download - Epdf.pub
Introduction to Kant's Anthropology by Micheal Foucault (Translated by Arianna Bove)

1798 non-fiction books
Anthropology books
Books by Immanuel Kant
Enlightenment philosophy
Ethics books
German non-fiction books
Philosophy textbooks